New Summerfield is a city in Cherokee County, Texas, United States. The population was 843 at the 2020 U.S. census.

Geography

New Summerfield is located in northeastern Cherokee County at  (31.977808, –95.110910). U.S. Route 79 passes through the community, leading west  to Jacksonville, the largest city in Cherokee County, and northeast  to Henderson. Texas State Highway 110 intersects US 79 in the center of New Summerfield, leading north  to Troup and south  to Rusk, the Cherokee County seat.

Climate

The climate in this area is characterized by hot, humid summers and generally mild to cool winters.  According to the Köppen Climate Classification system, New Summerfield has a humid subtropical climate, abbreviated "Cfa" on climate maps.

Demographics

As of the 2020 United States census, there were 843 people, 215 households, and 178 families residing in the city, down from 1,111 at the 2010 census.

Education
New Summerfield is served by the New Summerfield Independent School District and home to the New Summerfield High School Hornets.

Notable people
Walt Dickson, former Major League Baseball player

References

Cities in Cherokee County, Texas
Cities in Texas